Adelaide–Mannum Road is a road that runs through the northern Adelaide Hills between the South Australian capital, Adelaide and Mannum on the Murray River. It is designated route A10 in the metropolitan area and B10 in rural areas, and is 79 kilometres in length. This name covers many consecutive streets and is not widely known to most drivers, as the entire allocation is still best known as by the names of its constituent parts: Northcote Terrace, North East Road, Torrens Valley Road, Randell Road and Adelaide Road. This article will deal with the entire length of the corridor for sake of completion, as well to avoid confusion between declarations.

Route
Northcote Terrace starts at the intersection of Robe Terrace and Park Road/Mann Road in North Adelaide, about 500 metres away from the beginning of Adelaide's O-Bahn Busway, changes name to North East Road a kilometre later to become a major arterial road that travels, as its name suggests, through the north-eastern suburbs of Adelaide. It continues through Adelaide's north-east growth corridor, beyond it to the distinctly less-urban region of Houghton, where it meets in an intersection with the Lower North East Road, leading back to Adelaide's more easterly suburbs. Just beyond Millbrook Reservoir, the road changes name to Torrens Valley Road and continues east, then just east of Birdwood turns off to become Randell Road, continuing east until it reaches the western edges of Mannum, where it changes name for the final time to Adelaide Road.

History
The road was first built in the 1840s to facilitate the growth and development of the towns and settlements along its length. It played a role in the gold rush of the 1860s. Today, the area boasts many tourist and historical sites, wineries and natural attractions, although only a few towns exist as more than historical sites.

Major intersections

References

See also

 Highways in Australia
 List of highways in South Australia

Highways in South Australia
Roads in Adelaide